= RAF Air Section 2 =

The RAF Air Section 2 (AS2) was founded in 1972. Its brief was to investigate complaints of low flying by RAF aircraft by members of the general public. The brief was widened to include the investigation of UFO reports, sometime in 1979.
